The Grand Alliance for Democracy (GAD) was a political multi-party electoral alliance during the 1987 Philippine legislative election. The coalition opposed the policies of incumbent president Corazon Aquino and her Lakas ng Bayan (LABAN; People's Power) coalition, while severing ties with ousted president Ferdinand Marcos. The coalition consisted mostly of defectors from the Kilusang Bagong Lipunan (New Society Movement), Marcos' political party, the Nacionalista Party and the United Nationalist Democratic Organization, the coalition that supported Aquino during the 1986 presidential election.

In the Senate election, LABAN won 22 of the 24 seats, with only San Juan mayor Joseph Estrada winning a seat outright for GAD; former Minister of Defense Juan Ponce Enrile, one of the leaders of the People Power Revolution that ousted Marcos, was eventually declared the winner of the last Senate seat, bringing the winning GAD candidates to two. Estrada later defected to the Liberal Party, one of the parties making up LABAN, making Enrile the sole member of the minority bloc in the Senate.

Candidates running under the GAD name won two seats in the House of Representatives elections, although its member parties such as the Nacionalistas and the KBL won 4 and 11 seats, respectively. Candidates running under GAD-affiliated parties also won seats.

GAD broke up after the elections.

See also
 Nationalist People's Coalition, the political party that led the opposition coalition during the 1995 elections.
 Laban ng Makabayang Masang Pilipino (LAMMP), the opposition coalition during the 1998 elections.
 Puwersa ng Masa, the opposition coalition during the 2001 elections.
 Koalisyon ng Nagkakaisang Pilipino (KNP), the opposition coalition during the 2004 elections.
 Genuine Opposition (GO), the opposition coalition during the 2007 elections.
 United Nationalist Alliance (UNA), the opposition coalition during the 2013 elections.

Defunct political party alliances in the Philippines
Political parties established in 1987